Wolfgang Müller (born 24 October 1957) is an artist, musician and writer, based in Berlin and Reykjavík, .

Müller is the founder of the multi-media performance art group Die Tödliche Doris ('The Deadly Doris').

Müller published the book Geniale Dilletanten in 1982, naming a musical genre encompassing Die Tödliche Doris, Einstürzende Neubauten, Malaria!, Frieder Butzmann and many others.

Müller's interest in Iceland and its culture has been documented in several art projects since 1988. He has participated in arts projects in both Germany and Iceland, addressing the Icelandic culture of elves, natural and supernatural phenomena. In 1998 he transferred the music of his first record with two sign language interpreters into signs and gestures and published it as a DVD, "Gehörlose Musik/Deaf Music" in 2006.

In 2003, Cologne based record label A-Musik released Müller's album Mit Wittgenstein In Krisuvík - Zweiundzwanzig Elfensongs Für Island. In 2009, Müller published Séance Vocibus Avium, an audioplay with reconstructed sounds of extinct birds for which Müller was awarded the Karl Sczuka-Preis.

Séance Vocibus Avium was also released on record by Gothenburg based record label Fang Bomb. The record contained 11 bird calls, performed by artists such as Wolfgang Müller himself, Justus Köhncke, Namosh, Max Müller and Annette Humpe. The record came with a 40-page catalog containing Müller's illustrations of the birds.

Discography
 BAT - Aus Der Schule Der Tödlichen Doris, LP, Die Tödliche Doris Schallplatten, 1989
 Mit Wittgenstein In Krisuvík - Zweiundzwanzig Elfensongs Für Island, CD/LP, A-Musik, 2003
 Wolfgang Müller & Namosh/Frieder Butzmann: 25 Jahre Geniale Diletanten, 7", Monitorpop Entertainment, 2006
 Gehörlose Musik/Deaf Music, DVD, Monitorpop Entertainment, 2006
 Séance Vocibus Avium, 7"/CD with catalogue, Fang Bomb, 2009

Partial bibliography
 Geniale Dilletanten, Merve Verlag, 1982
 Die Tödliche Doris. KUNST/ART, Verlag Martin Schmitz, 1999
 Die Tödliche Doris. FILM/CINEMA, Verlag Martin Schmitz, 2003
 Neues von der Elfenfront. Die Wahrheit über Island, Suhrkamp, 2007
 Ästhetik der Präsenzen - Valeska Gert, Verlag Martin Schmitz, 2010.

External links
Official website
 Discogs
 Martin Schmitz Verlag
Wofgang Müller bei Galerie K´

1957 births
Living people
German male artists
German male musicians
People from Wolfsburg
German male writers